Lyubov Perepelova (born 26 February 1979) is an Uzbekistani sprinter who specializes in the 100 and 200 metres.

From July 2005 to July 2007 she was suspended due to a doping offense.

Achievements

Personal bests
60 metres - 7.31 s (2005)
100 metres - 11.04 s (2000)
200 metres - 22.72 s (2000)

References
 

1979 births
Living people
Uzbekistani female sprinters
Athletes (track and field) at the 2000 Summer Olympics
Athletes (track and field) at the 2004 Summer Olympics
Olympic athletes of Uzbekistan
Doping cases in athletics
Uzbekistani sportspeople in doping cases
Asian Games medalists in athletics (track and field)
Athletes (track and field) at the 1998 Asian Games
Athletes (track and field) at the 2002 Asian Games
Asian Games silver medalists for Uzbekistan
Asian Games bronze medalists for Uzbekistan
World Athletics Championships athletes for Uzbekistan
Medalists at the 1998 Asian Games
Medalists at the 2002 Asian Games
Olympic female sprinters
20th-century Uzbekistani women
21st-century Uzbekistani women